Kentucky Route 1631 (KY 1631) is a  state highway in the U.S. State of Kentucky. Its southern terminus is at Interstate 264 (I-264) in Louisville and its northern terminus is at U.S. Route 60 Alternate (US 60 Alt.) in Louisville.

Major junctions

References

1631
1631
Transportation in Louisville, Kentucky